Dacrymyces ovisporus is a species of fungus in the family Dacrymycetaceae. It was first described scientifically by German mycologist Julius Oscar Brefeld in 1888. The fungus produces roughly spherical to ovoid spores, and both one- and two-spored basidia.

References

External links

Dacrymycetes
Fungi described in 1888